Disha may refer to
Disha (film)
Disha (given name)
DISHA (spacecraft)
Tumhari Disha, an Indian television series